Alex MacKenzie (1885 – December 1965) was a Scottish character actor who was born and died in Glasgow. He was a schoolteacher in Clydebank until he was 61, before taking up a new profession.

Filmography

References

External links 

Scottish male film actors
Male actors from Glasgow
1885 births
1965 deaths
20th-century Scottish male actors